Hugo Hernández (born September 11, 1985) is a Mexican professional boxer.

Professional career
On July 24, 2010 Hernández will be fighting against undefeated Antonio Lozada jr. for the WBC FECARBOX Light Welterweight title.

References

External links

Boxers from Sinaloa
Welterweight boxers
Light-welterweight boxers
1985 births
Living people
Mexican male boxers
21st-century Mexican people